Events from the year 1961 in art.

Events
 January 5 – Italian sculptor Alfredo Fioravanti goes to the United States consulate in Rome to confess that he was part of the team that forged the Etruscan terracotta warriors in the Metropolitan Museum of Art.
 March 2 – Release of British film The Rebel starring Tony Hancock, satirizing artistic pretensions.
 March 17 – Publication in the United States of Irving Stone's biographical novel of Michelangelo, The Agony and the Ecstasy.
 May 29–June 17 – War Babies exhibition at the Huysman Gallery in Los Angeles featuring the work of Joe Goode, Larry Bell, Ed Bereal and Ron Miyashiro. Controversy generated by the exhibition's poster leads to the gallery closing down soon after the exhibition ends.
 August 21 – Goya's Portrait of the Duke of Wellington is stolen from the National Gallery in London three weeks after first going on display there.
 October–December – Henri Matisse's 1953 paper-cut Le Bateau is hung upside down in the Museum of Modern Art in New York.
 First Fluxus event organised by George Maciunas at the AG Gallery in New York.
 Yves Klein patents his use of International Klein Blue.

Awards
 Archibald Prize: William Edwin Pidgeon – Rabbi Dr I Porush
 John Moores Painting Prize: Henry Mundy for "Cluster"

Works
 Alexander Archipenko – Queen of Sheba (sculpture)
 Thomas Hart Benton – Independence and the Opening of the West
 Peter Blake – Self-portrait with badges
 Nicola Cantore and Luigi Gheno – Rudolph Valentino memorial in Castellaneta, Italy
 M. C. Escher – Waterfall (lithograph)
 Jane Frank – Crags and Crevices
 Jacob Epstein (died 1959) – The Rush of Green (bronze)
 Alberto Giacometti – L'Homme qui marche I (bronze)
 Rodney Gordon – Michael Faraday Memorial (Elephant and Castle, London)
 Barbara Hepworth – Curved Form (Bryher) (bronze)
 David Hockney – We Two Boys Together Clinging
 Edward Hopper – A Woman in the Sun
 Friedensreich Hundertwasser – Houses in Rain of Blood
 Jasper Johns – Map
 Gerald Kelly – Ralph Vaughan Williams
 Mati Klarwein – Annunciation
 Yves Klein – Blue Monochrome
 Roy Lichtenstein
 Electric Cord
 Engagement Ring
 Girl with Ball
 I Can See the Whole Room...and There's Nobody in It!
 Look Mickey
 Mr. Bellamy
 Roto Broil
 Morris Louis – Beta Lambda
 Piero Manzoni – Artist's Shit (90 tin cans)
 Joan Miró – Bleu II
 Robert Motherwell – Black on White
 Pablo Picasso – Jacqueline
 Bridget Riley – Movement in Squares
 Mark Rothko – Orange, Red, Yellow
 William Scott – Mural for Altnagelvin Hospital, Derry
 Tony Smith – Cigarette (1/3) (environmental sculpture)
 David Wynne – Gorilla (polished marble, Crystal Palace Park, London)
 Yakovenko and Baranov – Garibaldi Monument in Taganrog
 Sacred Heart of Jesus (Indianapolis; approximate date)
 Stucco statue of Paul Bunyan (Trees of Mystery, Klamath, California)

Births
 March 9 – Jo Ractliffe, South African photographer
 March 26 – Leigh Bowery, Australian performance artist, club promoter, actor, model and fashion designer (d. 1994)
 April 28 – Grenville Davey, English sculptor, winner of the Turner Prize
 August 12 – Karsten Schubert, German-born London art dealer (d. 2019)
 September 21 – Kurt Jackson, English landscape painter
 October 24 – Lita Cabellut, Spanish painter

Deaths
 January 30 – John Duncan Fergusson, Scottish Colourist painter (b. 1874)
 February 11 – Kate Carew, American caricaturist (b. 1869)
 February 20 – Jane Emmet de Glehn, American painter (b. 1873)
 March – Stanley Royle, English post-impressionist landscape painter (b. 1888)
 April 7 – Vanessa Bell, English painter and designer (b. 1879)
 June 6 – Alfons Karpiński, Polish painter (b. 1875)
 July 6 – Cuno Amiet, Swiss painter and sculptor (b. 1868)
 July 12 – Iva Despić-Simonović, Croatian sculptor (b. 1891)
 August 3 – Hilda Rix Nicholas, Australian painter (b. 1884)
 August 13 – Mario Sironi, Italian painter (b. 1885)
 October 1 – Sir William Reid Dick, Scottish sculptor (b. 1879)
 October 7 – Duilio Barnabè, Italian painter (b. 1914)
 October 13 – Augustus John, Welsh painter (b. 1878)
 December 9 – Kosta Hakman, Serbian painter (b. 1899)
 December 13 – Grandma Moses, American folk artist (b. 1860)
 Full date unknown – Albert Swinden, English-born American painter (b. 1901)

See also
 1961 in fine arts of the Soviet Union

References

 
Years of the 20th century in art
1960s in art